HMS Gloucester was a 74-gun, third rate  built for the Royal Navy in the 1810s. She played a minor role in the Napoleonic Wars and was cut down into a 50-gun fourth rate frigate in 1831–32. The ship was converted into a receiving ship and broken up in 1884.

Description
The ship's tonnage was 1770 tons burthen. Gloucester was armed with twenty-eight 32-pounder cannon on her main gundeck, twenty-eight 18-pounder cannon on her upper gundeck, four 12-pounder cannon and ten 32-pounder carronades the quarterdeck, two more pairs of 12-pounder guns and 32-pounder carronades on the forecastle, and six 18-pounder carronades on the poop deck. The ship had a crew of 590 officers and ratings.

Construction and career
Gloucester, named after the eponymous port, was the sixth ship of her name to serve in the Royal Navy. She was ordered on 11 June 1808 from Thomas Pitcher and was laid down at his Northfleet dockyard in March 1808, launched on 27 February 1812 and was towed to Sheerness where the ship was completed on 11 June. Gloucester cost £62,519 to build and an additional £25,343 to outfit. The ship was commissioned in April 1813 under the command of Captain Robert Williams for duty in the North Sea and then the Baltic Sea.

She was reduced to a 50-gun ship in 1831–32, and was sold for scrap in May 1884.

Notes

References

Lavery, Brian (2003) The Ship of the Line - Volume 1: The Development of the Battlefleet 1650-1850. Conway Maritime Press. .

Ships of the line of the Royal Navy
Vengeur-class ships of the line
Ships built in Northfleet
1812 ships